USS Colossus may refer to the following ships of the United States Navy:

, a steamer which served during the American Civil War
, a monitor, which was renamed from Kalamazoo on 15 June 1869

United States Navy ship names